Clania ignobilis, the faggot case moth, is a species of moth of the family Psychidae. It is found in New South Wales, Queensland, South Australia, Tasmania and Victoria.

Adult males have wingspan of about 30 mm and translucent grey wings which easily lose their scales. The female is wingless.

The larvae feed on Eucalyptus, Betula pendula, Callitris and Pinus species. It constructs a silken case of 40–50 mm it which it lives and pupates. They attach twigs parallel to the axis of the case. Often, all the twigs are of uniform length, except for one twig which is cut longer than the others. The larvae normally only protrude the head and thorax out of the case, as these are covered in a hard skin that is coloured in a light and dark brown pattern. The soft abdomen is kept inside the protective case.

External links
Australian Faunal Directory
Brisbane Insects
Australian Insects

Psychidae
Moths of Australia
Moths described in 1873